Lars Larsson (born 1947) is a Swedish writer, photographer, and adventurer. Chair of prehistoric archaeology at Lund University in Sweden, Larsson has devoted most of his research career to the Stone Age in southernmost Sweden. Among his fieldwork may be noted excavations at the Ageröd bog, famous Late Mesolithic cemeteries at Skateholm, a Mesolithic shell midden and a Neolithic megalithic tomb in Portugal.

In the 1990s, Larsson directed excavations of Middle Palaeolithic cave settlements in northern Zimbabwe. In the 90s and 00s he has also made important contributions to the study of the 1st Millennium AD through excavations at Uppåkra near Lund.

In 1989, Larsson was elected as a member of the Royal Swedish Academy of Letters, and in 2001, member of the Royal Swedish Academy of Sciences. Beginning in 2008, he is Head Editor of the Academy's journal Fornvännen.

Publications

External links
University of Lund staff profile.
Fornvännen. A Swedish archaeological journal.

1947 births
Swedish archaeologists
Academic staff of Lund University
Members of the Royal Swedish Academy of Sciences
Living people